Rae Julia Theresa Abruzzo (July 3, 1926 – April 6, 2022), professionally known as Rae Allen, was an American actress of stage, film and television, director, and singer, and also opened her own drama school's and was an acting coach, her career spanned some seventy years and eight decades.

Rae started her career in theatre in 1941 in a production of Gilbert and Sullivan and made her debut on Broadway in 1948, moving to television and film roles in 1958, making her screen debut in Damn Yankees. She appeared in numerous guest roles in TV shows, but she was best known of recurring parts in sitcom All in the Family (1972-1973) and in The Sopranos. Her film roles included A League of Their Own (1992) and Stargate.

Early and personal life
Allen was born as Rae Julia Theresa Abruzzo in Brooklyn, New York City on July 3, 1926, to Julia (née Riccio), a seamstress and hairdresser and Joseph Abruzzo, an opera singer and chauffeur, whose brothers acted in vaudeville. 
 
At the age of 25, she played Buttercup in H.M.S. Pinafore. Rae Allen trained at the HB Studio in New York City's Greenwich Village. She graduated from the American Academy of Dramatic Arts in 1947. She was first married to John M. Allen and then divorced; and later married and divorced, politician Herbert Harris.

Rae Allen died in her sleep on April 6, 2022, at the age of 95 at the Motion Picture & Television Fund retirement community in Woodland Hills, CA. She is survived by her four nieces: Nadine (McCann), Laura, Deborah, and Betty Cosgrove. 

Theatre
Allen won the Tony Award, for Best Featured Actress in a Play for And Miss Reardon Drinks a Little, she had two prior Tony nominations, including one for Best Featured Actress in Damn Yankees in 1955 and for the same category in Traveller Without Luggage in 1967. She appeared in the original Broadway production of Damn Yankees as the nosy reporter Gloria and recreated the role in the film adaptation, in both of which she introduced the song "Shoeless Joe from Hannibal, Mo."

Film and television
Allen appeared in such films as Reign Over Me, A League of Their Own, Stargate, and Where's Poppa? On television, she appeared on two consecutive episodes of Seinfeld as unemployment counselor Lenore Sokol, who must deal with George Costanza, who tries to get her to approve an extension of his benefits by dating her homely daughter, who ends up rejecting him. She also made appearances on television shows such as The Patty Duke Show, Hill Street Blues, All in the Family, Car 54 Where Are You, Head of the Class, Remington Steele, The Sopranos, and Grey's Anatomy.

Broadway theatre
Selected roles
 Damn Yankees (1954–1955)
 The Pajama Game (1954–1956)
  Oliver! (1963-1964)
 On a Clear Day You Can See Forever (1965)
 Fiddler on the Roof And Miss Reardon Drinks a Little (for which she won the 1971 Tony Award for Supporting Actress)
 Dude'' (1972)

Filmography

Film and television

References

External links

1926 births
2022 deaths
20th-century American actresses
21st-century American actresses
American Academy of Dramatic Arts alumni
American film actresses
American musical theatre actresses
American stage actresses
American television actresses
American people of Italian descent
Actresses from New York City
Musicians from Brooklyn
Tony Award winners